Afshar-e Olya (also Romanized as Afshār-e ‘Olyā; also known as Afshār, Afshār-e Bālā, Afshār Tātakī, Kagarān, Kegran, and Tābakī Afshār) is a village in Sanjabad-e Jonubi Rural District, Firuz District, Kowsar County, Ardabil Province, Iran. At the 2006 census, its population was 28, in 8 families.

References 

Towns and villages in Kowsar County